Mohamad Kdouh may refer to:

 Mohamad Kdouh (footballer, born 1993), Lebanese association football player
 Mohamad Kdouh (footballer, born 1997), Lebanese association football player